The 2015 U.S. Open Grand Prix Gold is the seventh grand prix gold and grand prix tournament of the 2015 BWF Grand Prix Gold and Grand Prix. The tournament will be held in Suffolk County Community College, New York, United States June 16 until June 21, 2015 and has a total purse of $120,000.

Players by nation

Men's singles

Seeds

  Chou Tien-chen (semi-final)
  Viktor Axelsen (withdrew)
  Hans-Kristian Vittinghus (final)
  Sho Sasaki (first round)
  Marc Zwiebler (withdrew)
  Dionysius Hayom Rumbaka (withdrew)
  Xue Song (second round)
  Hsu Jen-hao (third round)
  Takuma Ueda (quarter-final)
  Wong Wing Ki (third round)
  Rajiv Ouseph (quarter-final)
  Ng Ka Long (quarter-final)
  Kazumasa Sakai (first round)
  Ajay Jayaram (third round)
  Riichi Takeshita (third round)
  Sai Praneeth (semi-final)

Finals

Top half

Section 1

Section 2

Section 3

Section 4

Bottom half

Section 5

Section 6

Section 7

Section 8

Women's singles

Seeds

  Nozomi Okuhara (champion)
  Akane Yamaguchi (semi-final)
  Zhang Beiwen (second round)
  Sayaka Takahashi (semi-final)
  Michelle Li (first round)
  Minatsu Mitani (quarter-final)
  Beatriz Corrales (second round)
  Pai Yu-po (second round)

Finals

Top half

Section 1

Section 2

Bottom half

Section 3

Section 4

Men's doubles

Seeds

  Hiroyuki Endo / Kenichi Hayakawa (withdrew)
  Hirokatsu Hashimoto / Noriyasu Hirata (second round)
  Kim Astrup / Anders Skaarup Rasmussen (first round)
  Takeshi Kamura / Keigo Sonoda (semi-final)
  Andrei Adistia / Hendra Aprida Gunawan (withdrew)
  Kenta Kazuno / Kazushi Yamada (quarter-final)
  Adam Cwalina / Przemyslaw Wacha (second round)
  Michael Fuchs / Johannes Schottler (second round)

Finals

Top half

Section 1

Section 2

Bottom half

Section 3

Section 4

Women's doubles

Seeds

  Reika Kakiiwa / Miyuki Maeda (first round)
  Eefje Muskens / Selena Piek (quarter-final)
  Shizuka Matsuo / Mami Naito (quarter-final)
  Jwala Gutta / Ashwini Ponnappa (semi-final)
  Yu Yang / Zhong Qianxin (champion)
  Eva Lee / Paula Lynn Obanana (second round)
  Johanna Goliszewski / Carla Nelte (quarter-final)
  Heather Olver / Lauren Smith (first round)

Finals

Top half

Section 1

Section 2

Bottom half

Section 3

Section 4

Mixed doubles

Seeds

  Michael Fuchs / Birgit Michels (semi-final)
  Lee Chun Hei / Chau Hoi Wah (final)
  Jacco Arends / Selena Piek (semi-final)
  Chan Yun Lung / Tse Ying Suet (second round)
  Jorrit de Ruiter / Samantha Barning (second round)
  Phillip Chew / Jamie Subandhi (first round)
  Liu Yuchen / Zhong Qianxin (first round)
  Toby Ng / Alex Bruce (quarter-final)

Finals

Top half

Section 1

Section 2

Bottom half

Section 3

Section 4

References

U.S. Open Badminton Championships
U.S. Open Grand Prix Gold
BWF Grand Prix Gold and Grand Prix
2015 in American sports
U.S. Open Grand Prix